Cruzin' may refer to:

Music
"Cruzin'", song by Kottonmouth Kings from Sunrise Sessions
"Cruzin'", song by 8Ball & MJG from Ridin High
"Cruzin'", song by Abraxas Pool
"Cruzin'", song by MC Magic from Princess/Princesa
"Cruzin'", song by Jackie Jackson from Be the One (album)
"Cruzin'", song by Damizza
"Cruzin'", song by Social Distortion from Live in Orange County
"Cruzin'", song by Esham from Suspended Animation (Esham album)
"Cruzin'", song by Currensy  from Canal Street Confidential   2015

Other
Car Cruzin List of programs broadcast by MTV2 (Canada)
Alvin Cruzin, person involved in 2017 Resorts World Manila attack
Cruzin Cooler, Ride-on cooler